Mono-BOC-cystamine (mono BOC protected cystamine) is a tert-butyloxycarbonyl (BOC) derivative of cystamine used as crosslinker in biotechnology and molecular biology applications. This compound was originally reported by Hansen et al.

Uses

The disulfide chain allows the mono-BOC-cystamine to be easily cleaved, allowing removal of the tagging residue when desired.

Mono-BOC-cystamine is used as a crosslinker for the synthesis of cleavable photo-cross-linking reagent.

Mono-BOC-cystamine is used as a crosslinker for the synthesis of a biodegradable cystamine spacer in PGA-cystamine-Gd-DO3A, which shows improved MRI contrast for breast carcinoma imaging in mice.

Related compounds

 Biotin-Peg2-Amine
 Biotin-Peg2-Maleimide
 Biotin-Peg3-Amine
 Biotin-Peg4-NHS

References 

Organic disulfides
Carbamates
Amines
Reagents for biochemistry
Tert-butyl compounds